Svetlana Valeryevna Bazhanova (born 1 December 1972) is a former speed skater.

Svetlana Bazhanova married Vadim Sayutin, a fellow speed skater in 1994.

Personal records
To put these personal records in perspective, the WR column lists the official world records on the dates that Bazhanova skated her personal records.

Bazhanova has an Adelskalender score of 165.905 points.

References
 Svetlana Bazhanova at SkateResults.com 
 Svetlana Bazhanova. Deutsche Eisschnelllauf Gemeinschaft e.V. (German Skating Association).
 Personal records from Jakub Majerski's Speedskating Database
 Evert Stenlund's Adelskalender pages
 Historical World Records. International Skating Union.
 Interview with Svetlana Bazhanova and Vadim Sayutin (in Russian)

1972 births
Living people
Olympic speed skaters of Russia
Olympic speed skaters of the Unified Team
Speed skaters at the 1992 Winter Olympics
Speed skaters at the 1994 Winter Olympics
Speed skaters at the 1998 Winter Olympics
Olympic gold medalists for Russia
Sportspeople from Chelyabinsk
Olympic medalists in speed skating
Russian female speed skaters
Medalists at the 1994 Winter Olympics